Ischnolea is a genus of longhorn beetles of the subfamily Lamiinae, containing the following species:

 Ischnolea bicolorata Galileo & Martins, 2007
 Ischnolea bimaculata Chevrolat, 1861
 Ischnolea crinita Thomson, 1860
 Ischnolea flavinota Galileo & Martins, 1993
 Ischnolea flavofemorata Breuning, 1943
 Ischnolea indistincta Breuning, 1942
 Ischnolea inexpectata Galileo & Martins, 1993
 Ischnolea longeantennata Breuning, 1942
 Ischnolea modesta Galileo & Martins, 1993
 Ischnolea oculata Galileo & Martins, 1993
 Ischnolea odettae Martins, Galileo & Tavakilian, 2008
 Ischnolea peruana Breuning, 1943
 Ischnolea piim Galileo & Martins, 1996
 Ischnolea singularis Galileo & Martins, 1993
 Ischnolea spinipennis Breuning, 1943
 Ischnolea strandi Breuning, 1942

References

Desmiphorini